Ian Oswald Guinness (born September 30, 1941) is an English author and social critic now based in Fairfax County, Virginia; he has lived in the United States since 1984.

Early life and education
Born on 30 September 1941 in Hsiang Cheng, China, to medical missionaries working there, Guinness is of Irish descent and the great-great-great grandson of Arthur Guinness, the Dublin brewer. He returned to England in 1951 for secondary school and eventual college.

Guinness received a Bachelor of Divinity degree (honours) from the University of London in 1966 and a Doctor of Philosophy degree from Oriel College, Oxford, in 1981, where he studied under Peter L. Berger.  According to his website, Os has written or edited more than 30 books that offer insight into current cultural, political, and social contexts.

Career

In the late 1960s, Guinness was a leader at the L'Abri community in Switzerland and, after Oxford, a freelance reporter for the BBC.

In 1984, Guinness went to the United States and became, first, a fellow at the Woodrow Wilson Center, and later a visiting fellow at the Brookings Institution.

From 1986 to 1989, Guinness served as Executive Director of the Williamsburg Charter Foundation and was the leading drafter of the Williamsburg Charter, a bicentennial clarification and reaffirmation of the religious liberty clauses of the first amendment. He also co-authored the public school curriculum "Living With Our Deepest Differences".

In 1991, along with Alonzo McDonald, he founded the Trinity Forum and served as Senior Fellow until 2004. Since then he has been a Senior Fellow with the EastWest Institute in New York, and is currently a Senior Fellow with the Oxford Centre for Christian Apologetics.

He was the primary drafter of The Global Charter of Conscience, published at the European Union Parliament in Brussels in June 2014.

Personal life
Guinness currently lives in McLean, Virginia, with his wife Jenny. They have one son.

An Anglican, he attended the Episcopal Church, but left it due to their theological liberalism in 2006. He currently attends The Falls Church, in the Anglican Church in North America. He was one of the speakers at the Anglican Church in North America Assembly in June 2014.

Bibliography
Guinness has written or edited more than 30 books. The following are a subset of the books written and edited between 1973 and present, in chronological order.

Authored books

 .
 .
 
 .
 .
 .
 .
 .
 .
 .
 .
 .
 .
 .
 .
 . 
 .
 .
 .
 .
 .
 .
 .
 .
 .
 .

Edited works

 .
 .
 .
 .
 
 .
 .
 .

References

External links
 
 
 
 
 
 

Alumni of Oriel College, Oxford
Living people
Anglican writers
British expatriates in China
American Christian religious leaders
Christian apologists
British emigrants to the United States
Os Guinness
1941 births
English people of Irish descent